Island Women is a 1958 American drama film directed by William Berke and written by Andrew Alexander and Philip Yordan. The film stars Marie Windsor, Vince Edwards, Marilee Earle, Leslie Scott and Irene Williams. The film was released in May 1958 by United Artists.

Plot

Cast 
Marie Windsor as Elizabeth
Vince Edwards as Mike
Marilee Earle as Jan
Leslie Scott as Eban
Irene Williams as Iron Woman
Kay Barnes as Mary Ann
Paul White as Constable
Maurine Duvalier as Calypso Mama

References

External links 
 

1958 films
1950s English-language films
United Artists films
American drama films
1958 drama films
Films directed by William A. Berke
1950s American films